Paweł Tabakow (born Pavel Ivanov Tabakov, ; born October 8, 1975) is a Polish neurosurgeon who is known for prepared and performing the operation that allowed Darek Fidyka to recover sensory and motor function after the complete severing of his spinal cord. 
Tabakow has claimed that an Indian ambassador and other people from round the world have contacted him about performing similar treatments.

Biography
Paweł Tabakow was born in Sofia, Bulgaria in 1975 and is a son of Bulgarian mathematician Iwan Tabakow. He graduated from the German High School in Sofia in 1994 and enrolled to study medicine in Wrocław, Poland.

He works in Department of Neurosurgery at Wrocław Medical University, and works at Wrocław University Hospital.

See also
Geoffrey Raisman, one of the leading researchers involved in Fidyka's treatment
Spinal cord injury
Olfactory ensheathing glia

References

External links
"UCL research helps paralysed man to recover function". University College London. 21 October 2014.
 www.axonaxis.pl/
 Nicholls Spinal Injury Foundation

Living people
Polish neurosurgeons
2014 in science
Polish people of Bulgarian descent
1975 births